Adnan Sabouni  is a Syrian football defender who played for Syria in the 1988 Asian Cup.

He died on 27 February 2015

International Record

References

11v11 Profile

2015 deaths
Syrian footballers
1971 births
Association football defenders
1988 AFC Asian Cup players
Syria international footballers